The Yorkshire Wolds Way is a National Trail in Yorkshire, England. It runs 79 miles (127 km) from Hessle to Filey, around the Yorkshire Wolds.  At Filey Brigg, it connects with the Cleveland Way, another National Trail.
In 2007 the Yorkshire Wolds Way celebrated the 25th anniversary of its official opening which took place on 2 October 1982.

Route

The route of the Yorkshire Wolds Way passes close to or through the following places:

 Hessle
 North Ferriby
 Melton
 Welton
 Brantingham
 South Cave
 North Newbald
 Goodmanham
 Market Weighton
 Londesborough
 Nunburnholme
 Pocklington
 Millington
 Huggate
 Fridaythorpe
 Thixendale
 Wharram Percy
 Wharram le Street
 Wintringham
 Sherburn
 Potter Brompton
 Ganton
 Muston
 Filey

Places in italics are slightly off the main route.

BBC documentary
Yorkshire Wolds Way, a 2017 two-part BBC television documentary, features a journey along the Yorkshire Wolds Way. Presenter Paul Rose describes the trail as "arguably Britain's least well-known national walking trail". The documentary was first broadcast in January 2017.

Races 
The Hardmoors Race Series features ultramarathons based on the Yorkshire Wolds Way and Cleveland Way. Included in the series is the Hardwolds 80-mile race comprising the entire length of the Yorkshire Wolds Way.

See also
 Long-distance footpaths in the UK

References

Further reading
 Walking The Wolds Way, David Clensy, 2007. 
 Yorkshire Wolds Way, Roger Ratcliffe, 2011. Official National Trail Guide.

External links

 Yorkshire Wolds Way – National Trails official site
 Yorkshire Wolds Way – the Ramblers
 The Long Distance Walkers Association
 Walk the Yorkshire Wolds Way

Footpaths in the East Riding of Yorkshire
Long-distance footpaths in England
1982 establishments in England
Yorkshire Wolds